In quantum mechanics, a particle in a spherically symmetric potential, is a quantum system with a potential that depends only on the distance between the particle and a defined center point. One example of a spherically symmetric potential is the electron within a hydrogen atom. The electron's potential only depends on its distance from the proton in the atom's nucleus. This potential can be derived from Coulomb's law.

In the general case, the dynamics of a particle in a spherically symmetric potential are governed by a Hamiltonian of the following form:

Where  is the mass of the particle,  is the momentum operator, and the potential  depends only on , the modulus of the radius vector. The possible quantum states of the particle can be found by using the above Hamiltonian to solve the Schrödinger equation for its eigenvalues and their corresponding eigenstates, which are wave functions.

When this is done, the time-independent Schrödinger equation for the system is separable. This means solutions to the angular dimensions of the equation can be found independently of the radial dimension. This leaves an ordinary differential equation in terms only of the radius, which determines the eigenstates for the particular potential, .

Structure of the eigenfunctions 

The eigenstates of the system have the form:

in which the spherical polar angles θ and φ represent the colatitude and azimuthal angle, respectively. The last two factors of ψ are often grouped together as spherical harmonics, so that the eigenfunctions take the form:

The differential equation which characterizes the function  is called the radial equation.

Derivation of the radial equation 

The kinetic energy operator in spherical polar coordinates is:

The spherical harmonics satisfy

Substituting this into the Schrödinger equation we get a one-dimensional eigenvalue equation,

This equation can be reduced to an equivalent 1-D Schrödinger equation by substituting , where  satisfies

which is precisely the one-dimensional Schrödinger equation with an effective potential given by

The correction to the potential V(r) is called the centrifugal barrier term.

If , then near the origin, .

Solutions for potentials of interest 
Five special cases arise, of special importance:
, or solving the vacuum in the basis of spherical harmonics, which serves as the basis for other cases.
for the three-dimensional isotropic harmonic oscillator.
 to describe bound states of hydrogen-like atoms.

The solutions are outlined in these cases, which should be compared to their counterparts in cartesian coordinates, cf. particle in a box. The following derivations rely heavily on Bessel functions and Laguerre polynomials.

Vacuum case states 

Let us now consider V(r) = 0 (if , replace everywhere E with ). Introducing the dimensionless variable

which regular solutions for positive energies are given by so-called Bessel functions of the first kind  so that the solutions written for R are the so-called Spherical Bessel function
.

The solutions of Schrödinger equation in polar coordinates for a particle of mass  in vacuum are labelled by three quantum numbers: discrete indices ℓ and m, and k varying continuously in :

These solutions represent states of definite angular momentum, rather than of definite (linear) momentum, which are provided by plane waves .

Sphere with finite "square" potential

That is, inside a sphere of radius  the potential is equal to V0 and it is zero outside the sphere. A potential with such a finite discontinuity is called a square potential.

We first consider bound states, i.e., states which display the particle mostly inside the box (confined states). Those have an energy E less than the potential outside the sphere, i.e., they have negative energy, and we shall see that there are a discrete number of such states, which we shall compare to positive energy with a continuous spectrum, describing scattering on the sphere (of unbound states). Also worth noticing is that unlike Coulomb potential, featuring an infinite number of discrete bound states, the spherical square well has only a finite (if any) number because of its finite range (if it has finite depth).

The resolution essentially follows that of the vacuum with normalization of the total wavefunction added, solving two Schrödinger equations — inside and outside the sphere — of the previous kind, i.e., with constant potential. Also the following constraints hold:
The wavefunction must be regular at the origin.
The wavefunction and its derivative must be continuous at the potential discontinuity.
The wavefunction must converge at infinity.

The first constraint comes from the fact that Neumann N and Hankel H functions are singular at the origin. The physical argument that ψ must be defined everywhere selected Bessel function of the first kind J over the other possibilities in the vacuum case. For the same reason, the solution will be of this kind inside the sphere:

with A a constant to be determined later. Note that for bound states, .

Bound states bring the novelty as compared to the vacuum case that E is now negative (in the vacuum it was to be positive). This, along with third constraint, selects Hankel function of the first kind as the only converging solution at infinity (the singularity at the origin of these functions does not matter since we are now outside the sphere):

Second constraint on continuity of ψ at  along with normalization allows the determination of constants A and B. Continuity of the derivative (or logarithmic derivative for convenience) requires quantization of energy.

Sphere with infinite "square" potential 

In case where the potential well is infinitely deep, so that we can take  inside the sphere and  outside, the problem becomes that of matching the wavefunction inside the sphere (the spherical Bessel functions) with identically zero wavefunction outside the sphere. Allowed energies are those for which the radial wavefunction vanishes at the boundary. Thus, we use the zeros of the spherical Bessel functions to find the energy spectrum and wavefunctions.

So that one is reduced to the computations of these zeros , typically by using a table or calculator, as these zeros are not solvable for the general case.

Their energy eigenvalues are thus:

3D isotropic harmonic oscillator 
The potential of a 3D isotropic harmonic oscillator is

An N-dimensional isotropic harmonic oscillator has the energies

i.e., n is a non-negative integral number; ω is the (same) fundamental frequency of the N modes of the oscillator. In this case N = 3, so that the radial Schrödinger equation becomes,

Introducing

and recalling that , we will show that the radial Schrödinger equation has the normalized solution,

where the function  is a generalized Laguerre polynomial in γr2 of order k (i.e., the highest power of the polynomial is proportional to γkr2k).

The normalization constant Nnℓ is,

The eigenfunction  belongs to energy  and is to be multiplied by the spherical harmonic , where

Derivation 
First we transform the radial equation by a few successive substitutions to the generalized Laguerre differential equation, which has known solutions: the generalized Laguerre functions. Then we normalize the generalized Laguerre functions to unity. This normalization is with the usual volume element .

First we scale the radial coordinate

and then the equation becomes

This substitution transforms the differential equation to

Transformation to Laguerre polynomials 
If the substitution  is used, and the differential operators become
 and

The expression between the square brackets multiplying f(y) becomes the differential equation characterizing the generalized Laguerre equation (see also Kummer's equation):

Provided  is a non-negative integral number, the solutions of this equations are generalized (associated) Laguerre polynomials

From the conditions on k follows: (i)  and (ii) n and ℓ are either both odd or both even. This leads to the condition on ℓ given above.

Recovery of the normalized radial wavefunction 
Remembering that , we get the normalized radial solution

The normalization condition for the radial wavefunction is

Substituting , gives  and the equation becomes

By making use of the orthogonality properties of the generalized Laguerre polynomials, this equation simplifies to

Hence, the normalization constant can be expressed as

Other forms of the normalization constant can be derived by using properties of the gamma function, while noting that n and ℓ are both of the same parity. This means that n + ℓ is always even, so that the gamma function becomes

where we used the definition of the double factorial. Hence, the normalization constant is also given by

Hydrogen-like atoms 

A hydrogenic (hydrogen-like) atom is a two-particle system consisting of a nucleus and an electron. The two particles interact through the potential given by Coulomb's law:

where
 ε0 is the permittivity of the vacuum,
 Z is the atomic number (eZ is the charge of the nucleus),
 e is the elementary charge (charge of the electron),
 r is the distance between the electron and the nucleus.

The mass m0, introduced above, is the reduced mass of the system. Because the electron mass is about 1836 times smaller than the mass of the lightest nucleus (the proton), the value of m0 is very close to the mass of the electron me for all hydrogenic atoms. In the remaining of the article we make the approximation m0 = me. Since me will appear explicitly in the formulas it will be easy to correct for this approximation if necessary.

In order to simplify the Schrödinger equation, we introduce the following constants that define the atomic unit of energy and length, respectively,

Substitute  and  into the radial Schrödinger equation given above. This gives an equation in which all natural constants are hidden,

Two classes of solutions of this equation exist: (i) W is negative, the corresponding eigenfunctions are square integrable and the values of W are quantized (discrete spectrum).
(ii) W is non-negative. Every real non-negative value of W is physically allowed (continuous spectrum), the corresponding eigenfunctions are non-square integrable. Considering only class (i) solutions restricts the solutions to wavefunctions which are bound states, in contrast to the class (ii) solutions that are known as scattering states.

For class (i) solutions with negative W the quantity  is real and positive. The scaling of y, i.e., substitution of  gives the Schrödinger equation:

The other solution, is physically non-acceptable. For  the inverse square power dominates and a solution for small x is xℓ+1. The other solution, x−ℓ, is physically non-acceptable.
Hence, to obtain a full range solution we substitute

The equation for fℓ(x) becomes,

Provided  is a non-negative integer, say k, this equation has polynomial solutions written as

which are generalized Laguerre polynomials of order k. We will take the convention for generalized Laguerre polynomials of Abramowitz and Stegun.
Note that the Laguerre polynomials given in many quantum mechanical textbooks, for instance the book of Messiah, are those of Abramowitz and Stegun multiplied by a factor (2ℓ+1+k)!.

The energy becomes

Since , the total radial wavefunction is

with normalization constant which absorbs extra terms from 

which belongs to the energy

In the computation of the normalization constant use was made of the integral

References

Partial differential equations
Quantum models